The 2014–15 Houston Cougars men's basketball team represented the University of Houston during the 2014–15 NCAA Division I men's basketball season. It was their first season under head coach Kelvin Sampson and second as members of the American Athletic Conference. The Cougars’ home arena was the on-campus Hofheinz Pavilion. Their record was 13–19, and 4–14 in conference play to finish in tenth place. They advanced to the quarterfinals of the 2015 American Conference tournament, where they lost to Tulsa.

Pre-season

Departures

Returnees

Incoming transfers

Class of 2014 signees

Injuries

In July, both LJ Rose and Mikhail McLean had foot surgery.  Each needed three to four months to recover.

Roster

Schedule and results
On May 28, the American Athletic Conference announced the format and opponents for the 2014–15 conference schedule. Due to an odd number of conference members and maintaining an 18-game schedule, each team played 8 opponents twice (home and away) and two opponents once (1 home, 1 away). UConn (home) and Temple (away) were the two teams the Cougars played just once this season. On July 18, the team announced participation in the championship pairings of the 2014 Continental Tire Las Vegas Classic, alongside Boise State, Texas Tech, and Loyola–Chicago at the Orleans Arena. Two on-campus games preceded the Las Vegas-hosted games, with one at South Carolina State.  In August, ESPN reported that Houston's visit to Harvard for a game on November 25. The remainder of the Cougars' schedule was announced by the American Athletic Conference on August 28.

|-
!colspan=12 style="background:#CC0000; color:white;"| Exhibition

|-
!colspan=12 style="background:#CC0000; color:white;"| Regular season

|-
!colspan=12 style="background:#CC0000; color:white;"| American Athletic Conference

Tournament

References

Houston
Houston Cougars men's basketball seasons
Houston
Houston